Santi Cosma e Damiano is a Roman Catholic church in the town of Isernia in the region of Molise, Italy.

History 
A chapel at the hilltop at this site was founded circa 1130, and by the 14th century, a new church was erected dedicated to the Saints Cosmas and Damian. The main altar was built in 1639 and houses a 16th-century canvas depicting the Madonna and Child with Saints and Cardinal Numaio. While bishop of the town, the Cardinal Numaio placed the church and its property under the property of the diocese.

The altar of the Virgin of the Addolorata (1744) is to the right of the nave. The altar of the Crucifixion on the left dates to 1645.

References 

Roman Catholic churches in Molise
12th-century Roman Catholic church buildings in Italy
14th-century Roman Catholic church buildings in Italy